The 2015–16 Lafayette Leopards men's basketball team represented Lafayette College during the 2015–16 NCAA Division I men's basketball season. The Leopards, led by twenty-first year head coach Fran O'Hanlon, played their home games at the Kirby Sports Center and were members of the Patriot League. They finished the season 6–24, 3–15 in Patriot League play to finish in last place. They lost to Navy in the first round of the Patriot League tournament.

Previous season
The Leopards finished the season 20–13, 9–9 in Patriot League play to finish in a tie for fourth place. They defeated Boston University, Bucknell, and American to become champions of the Patriot League tournament. They received an automatic bid to the NCAA tournament where they lost in the second round to Villanova.

Departures

Incoming recruits

2016 class recruits

Roster

Schedule

|-
!colspan=9 style="background:#800000; color:#000000;"| Non-conference regular season

|-
!colspan=9 style="background:#800000; color:#000000;"| Patriot League regular season

|-
!colspan=9 style="background:#800000; color:#000000;"| Patriot League tournament

See also
 2015–16 Lafayette Leopards women's basketball team

References

Lafayette Leopards men's basketball seasons
Lafayette
Lafayette
Lafayette